Burchard Joan Elias (12 July 1799 – 1 May 1871) was the last Governor-General of the Dutch West Indies, a colony that existed between 1828 and 1845 as a merger of Surinam and Curaçao and Dependencies. After Elias left office, the colony was again split. Before his governorship, Elias served as resident of Cirebon (1830–1838) and as Secretary-General of the Ministry of the Colonies (1838–1842).

Biography

Burchard Joan Elias was born in Amsterdam to Gerbrand Elias and Henriëtte Alexandrine Adélaïde von Deneken. In 1823, he married Cornelia Dorothea Adelheid Scholten van Aschat. After her death in 1836, he married her sister Lidie Henriëtte Scholten van Aschat in 1837.

Burchard Joan Elias was the father of Henri Alexander Elias, who served as Governor of the Dutch Gold Coast.

References

1799 births
1871 deaths
Governors of Suriname
People from Amsterdam